Strawberry is an unincorporated community in Berkeley County, in the U.S. state of South Carolina.

History
A post office called Strawberry was established in 1879, and remained in operation until it was discontinued in 1936. Strawberry was originally the name of a nearby plantation.

References

Unincorporated communities in Berkeley County, South Carolina
Unincorporated communities in South Carolina